Pyaar Mohabbat  is a 1988 Indian film directed by Ajay Kashyap. It is filmed in the Western-style targeted for an Indian audience.

Cast
Govinda... Rajiv Lal
Mandakini... Nisha
Raakhee... Ramvati
Bindu
Shakti Kapoor... Chaudhary Gulab Rai
Kader Khan... Seth Dhaniram

Soundtrack

External links
 
 http://www.bollywoodhungama.com/movies/cast/5195/index.html

1980s Hindi-language films
1988 films
Films scored by Laxmikant–Pyarelal